Jesse Huta Galung was the defending champion of the tennis tournament.

David Goffin won the title, defeating Jarkko Nieminen 7–6(7–3), 6–3

Seeds

Draw

Finals

Top half

Bottom half

References
Main Draw
Qualifying Draw

Tampere Open - Singles
2014 Singles